The commonly called Palace of the Dukes of Medinaceli (Spanish: Palacio de los Duques de Medinaceli) is a Renaissance palace located in Cogolludo, Spain.

One of the oldest titles of the House of Medinaceli is the marquisate of Cogolludo, traditionally borne by the heir to the Dukedom of Medinaceli itself. The palace of the marquises of Cogolludo is a gem of pure Spanish renaissance architecture, constructed between c. 1402 and 1502.

It is one of a number of monuments most closely associated with the Dukes of Medinaceli.

It was declared Bien de Interés Cultural [historical and architectural landmark] in 1931.

References

External links 

Bien de Interés Cultural landmarks in the Province of Guadalajara
Buildings and structures in the Province of Guadalajara
Palaces in Castilla–La Mancha
Renaissance architecture in Castilla–La Mancha